Siddaramanahundi Siddarame Gowda Siddaramaiah (born 3 August 1947), also referred to by his nickname Siddu is an Indian politician who served as the Chief Minister of Karnataka from 13 May 2013 to 17 May 2018. He currently serves as the Leader of the Opposition in Karnataka Legislative Assembly since 9 December 2019. He belongs to Indian National Congress party and a member of Congress Working Committee.

Siddaramaiah was a member of various Janata Parivar factions for several years. Earlier, as a Janata Dal (Secular) leader, he was the deputy chief minister of Karnataka on two occasions. On 13 May 2013 he was sworn in as the chief minister of Karnataka. He has presently continued as the opposition leader of Karnataka despite his resignation, which was not accepted at higher levels and continued his tenure.

Early life and career
He was born to Siddarame Gowda and Boramma in a remote village called Siddaramanahundi in Varuna Hobli near T. Narasipura of Mysore district in a farming family. He had no formal schooling until he was ten but went on to do his B. Sc. and LL.B. from Mysore University. He is the second among five siblings and he belongs to Kuruba Gowda/ 
 Gadariya/ Shepherd community.

Siddaramaiah was a junior under a lawyer, Chikkaboraiah, in Mysore and later taught law for some time.

Personal life
Siddaramaiah is mononymous. Siddaramaiah is married to Parvathi and had two sons. His elder son, Rakesh, seen as his father's heir in politics, died of multiple organ failure in 2016 at the age of 38. The surviving son, Yathindra, contested the 2018 Legislative Assembly elections and won from the seat of Varuna in Mysuru, formerly his father's seat, by over 45,000 votes.

Siddaramaiah has stated on record that he is an atheist, though he has more recently clarified his public stance on the subject: "Word has spread that I am an atheist, which I am not. I am spiritual -- I have participated in festivities as child. I have visited some of the popular pilgrimage centres. But I am definitely against superstition, as I view everything from science point of view,".

Political career
Before 1978, he began political career when Nanjunda Swamy, a lawyer in Mysore, spotted him at the district courts as a law graduate. He was asked to contest and was elected to the Mysore Taluka. H contested on a Bharatiya Lok Dal ticket from Chamundeshwari constituency and entered the 7th Karnataka Legislative Assembly in 1983. This was a surprise victory for all and it earned him a name and fame in the Old Mysore region.

Later he joined the ruling Janata Party and became the first president of the Kannada Surveillance Committee (Kannada Kavalu Samiti), set up to supervise the implementation of Kannada as an official language. During the mid-term polls in 1985, Siddaramaiah was re-elected from the same constituency and became Minister for Animal Husbandry and Veterinary Services. In Chief Minister Ramakrishna Hegde's government, he handled diverse portfolios such as Sericulture, Animal Husbandry and Transport at different stages.

He first suffered defeat in the 1989 Assembly elections, beaten by a veteran Congress leader, M. Rajasekara Murthy. Later in 1992, he was appointed Secretary General of Janata Dal, which H. D. Deve Gowda had also joined. He was elected again in the 1994 State Elections and became the Minister for Finance in the Janata Dal government headed by Deve Gowda. He was made Deputy Chief Minister when J. H. Patel became Chief Minister in 1996. He was sacked as Deputy Chief Minister and dropped from the Cabinet on 22 July 1999. After the split in the Janata Dal, he joined the Janata Dal (Secular) faction of Deve Gowda and became the president of its state unit. However, he lost in the 1999 state elections. In 2004, when the Indian National Congress and JD (S) formed a coalition government with Dharam Singh as Chief Minister, he was again appointed Deputy Chief Minister. He addressed ahinda samavesha in Hubballi, which had the huge public gathering. He even challenged Reddy brothers in the house when he was the leader of the opposition that he would come to Bellary through padayatra. It garnered attention of whole state and eventually Siddaramaiah came to power in 2013.

Siddaramaiah celebrated his 75th birthday on 3 August 2022 in Davanagere and called it "Siddaramotsava", where more than 16 lakh followers of Siddaramaiah had attended the program.

Indian National Congress
In 2005, after differences with H. D. Deve Gowda, Siddaramaiah was expelled from JD (S). He wanted to form a regional party "ABPJD" in the state after quitting the JD (S), but he did not because regional parties formed earlier in Karnataka had not survived. He subsequently garnered mass support from the backward classes and joined the Congress at a large public meeting held in Bangalore, in Sonia Gandhi's presence. He won the Chamundeshwari bypolls held in December 2006, by a margin of 257 votes against M. Shivabasappa of JD (S), despite a fierce campaign against him by Deve Gowda, Chief Minister Kumaraswamy and Deputy Chief Minister Yeddyurappa in the constituency. In the 2008 state Assembly elections, he contested from Varuna Constituency and was re-elected for the fifth time.

He won the 2013 election from the same constituency (Varuna) on 8 May 2013 and was reelected for the 7th time. He was elected as the leader of the Congress legislative party in the Karnataka assembly on 10 May 2013. He had previously announced that the 2013 Assembly election would be his last election, but in the 2018 Karnataka Legislative Assembly election, he left his safe Varuna seat for his son, and he himself went on to contest from two constituencies, i.e. Chamundeshwari and Badami, and faced stiff competition against GT Devegowda of JD (S) and B. Sriramulu of BJP respectively, both of which were new constituencies for him. He lost in Chamundeshwari, but won in Badami vidhan sabha seat beating BJP heavyweight Sriramulu with a narrow margin of 1,696 votes and he was reelected for the 8th time. Congress under his leadership then supported the Janata Dal (Secular) in forming the government in 2018 to keep BJP out of power. He was the chairman of coordination committee that coordinated the congress-JDS coalition govt under H. D Kumarswamy. After the resignation of 17 MLAs, leading to the downfall of the coalition government, Siddaramaiah took the leadership of the upcoming by-elections in Karnataka.

The by-polls were held on 5 December 2019 for the 15 assembly seats. Though Siddaramaiah expressed his confidence in winning 12 out of the 15 contested seats, Congress managed to win only 2 seats and the JDS winning none of it. This was a major setback for his leadership and differences arose among his own party members questioning his leadership. Thus Siddaramaiah resigned as the Leader of the CLP and the Leader of opposition of the Karnataka Legislative Assembly on 9 December.

Chief Minister of Karnataka

Siddaramaiah was elected as Chief Minister after Congress adopted secret balloting to select the new chief minister.
He led the Indian National Congress to victory by achieving an absolute majority of 122/224 seats in the 2013 Legislative Assembly election.

On 15 May 2018, he resigned from his position of the Chief minister of Karnataka, respecting the verdict of the 2018 Karnataka Legislative Assembly election. He also became the first chief minister of Karnataka to serve full 5 years term in 40 years, and the second in the history of the southern state after Devaraj Urs. He also holds the record of presenting state budget 13 times as a finance minister in Government of Karnataka. Despite allegations of mounting debt on state exchequer by the opposition, he is known for maintaining fiscal prudence within the ambit of Fiscal Responsibility and Budget Management Act of the state.

Electoral Performance

Positions held

Other positions held 
 Minister for Finance, Karnataka (1994)
 Minister for Animal Husbandry and Veterinary Services (1985)
 Minister for Sericulture and Animal Husbandry
 Minister for Transport
 Minister for Higher Education
 Member, Congress Working Committee
 He has represented Chamundeshwari, Varuna, and Badami Vidhan Sabha seats at various points of his career so far.

See also 
Siddaramaiah cabinet

Notes

References

External links

|-

|-

|-

1944 births
Living people
Deputy Chief Ministers of Karnataka
Politicians from Mysore
Indian socialists
Leaders of the Opposition in the Karnataka Legislative Assembly
Chief ministers from Indian National Congress
Indian National Congress politicians
Janata Dal (Secular) politicians
Janata Party politicians
Janata Dal politicians
Karnataka MLAs 2004–2007
Karnataka MLAs 2008–2013
Karnataka MLAs 2013–2018
Karnataka MLAs 2018–2023
Chief Ministers of Karnataka
Bharatiya Lok Dal politicians